Emanuele Paternò, 9th Marquess of Sessa was an Italian chemist and is credited with the discovery of the Paternò–Büchi reaction.

Biography 
He was born in Palermo in 1847 as the Marquess of Sessa, in a branch of the House of Paternò. He studied at the University of Palermo with Stanislao Cannizzaro.

Scientific career 
In 1871 he became a lecturer at the University of Torino, but returned to Palermo the following year as Cannizzaro's successor.
In 1892 he became a professor at the University of Rome. His main area of research was photochemistry, and discovered the Paternò–Büchi reaction in 1909. The reaction was improved by George Büchi, its other namesake, in 1954.

Political career 
Paternò was politically active. He served as the Mayor of Palermo (1890–1892), and in 1890 he was appointed by King Victor Emmanuel III a member of the Senate of the Kingdom of Italy. He was later elected vice president (1904-1919) of the Italian upper house.

References

1847 births
1935 deaths
Italian chemists
University of Palermo alumni
Mayors of Palermo
Scientists from Palermo